The Batman Adventures: Mad Love is a one-shot comic book written by Paul Dini (writer on Batman: The Animated Series and Batman Beyond) and Bruce Timm  (executive producer on The New Batman/Superman Adventures and the co-creator of Batman: The Animated Series). Set in the continuity of Batman: The Animated Series, it won an Eisner Award for "Best Single Story" in 1994. It was later adapted (with minor alterations for pacing) as an episode of the animated series The New Batman Adventures.

Plot
After his latest scheme of killing Commissioner Gordon is foiled by Batman, the Joker retreats to his hideout to plan his next move, but is annoyed by his lovestruck sidekick Harley Quinn, and kicks her out. As Harley bemoans the state of her life, she recalls how she first met the Joker, back when she was psychologist Dr. Harleen Quinzel and spending an internship at Arkham Asylum. Convinced by the Joker himself to do it, Harleen interviewed him and learned he was abused as a child by his alcoholic father. After more interviews, Harleen determined Batman was the primary source of the Joker's anger and was to blame for his actions, but that she also had fallen in love with him. Harleen helped the Joker escape and became his sidekick in hopes that she could win his love.

Harley decides the only way she can make the Joker finally love her back is to kill Batman, which she attempts to do by capturing him so she can feed him to a school of piranhas, one of the Joker's unused plans. Batman distracts her by telling her the Joker has been using her from the start, with the Joker's stories to her of having an unhappy childhood being lies he has told to others, some with different details each time. When she tearfully insists the Joker really loves her, Batman convinces her to call him so he will know she will accomplish her goal (as the piranhas would leave no convincing evidence). The Joker arrives, however, infuriated by how Harley would rob him of the privilege of killing Batman, and knocks her out a window, where she is found gravely injured by nearby police officers. The Joker then decides, nonetheless, to use the opportunity to finally kill Batman, which escalates into a chase ending atop a moving subway train. Batman taunts the Joker by saying that Harley, with her plan, had come closer to killing him than he ever did. The Joker attacks him in a fit of rage, but Batman sends him plunging into a burning smokestack with a punch.

Back in Arkham Asylum, Harley Quinn renounces the Joker forever, wanting nothing more than to heal and then leave Arkham for good. Lying on her bed a moment later, however, Harley finds flowers sent by her clownish beau with a "get well soon" card and falls in love with him all over again.

Reprints
Mad Love was reprinted as a graphic novella in 1998, and in 2009 the story was collected – alongside a number of others by Bruce Timm and Paul Dini – in a hardcover collection titled Batman: Mad Love and Other Stories.

Critical reaction
IGN Comics said that "Mad Love is everything a comic book should be" and called it "one Batman book everyone should read".

Awards
 1994:
 Won "Best Single Issue" Eisner Award
 Bruce Timm was nominated for "Best Penciller/Inker or Penciller-Inker Team" Eisner Award, for his work on Mad Love

In other media 
An animated adaptation of the issue, nearly identical in script and design to the original comic, originally aired on the WB Network on January 16, 1999, as an episode of The New Batman Adventures. The script was written by Paul Dini, and the episode was directed by Butch Lukic. Perhaps the only contrasts to the comic over the episode were the revamped character designs and the removal of minor scenes for pacing and time concerns.

In 2008, Warner Premiere Digital adapted Mad Love as part of DC Comics' motion comics line, available for download through digital outlets such as iTunes and Xbox Live.  Subscribers can download each chapter separately from Xbox Live, but iTunes groups the seven chapters into three downloads (Chapters 1 & 2, Chapters 3, 4, & 5, and Chapters 6 & 7).

Batman: Arkham Asylum, also penned by Dini, lifts much of its dialogue from Harley Quinn's patient interviews from Mad Love. Batman: Arkham Origins, the prequel to Asylum, also uses much of Mad Loves plot in retelling Harley Quinn's first encounter with the Joker.

Paul Dini and Pat Cadigan wrote a novel adaptation of the former's original story under the title Harley Quinn: Mad Love, released on November 13, 2018, by Titan Books.

Notes

References

 .
 .

Works based on Batman: The Animated Series
Comics based on television series
Comics by Paul Dini
Eisner Award winners
Harvey Award winners for Best Single Issue or Story
Films with screenplays by Paul Dini
Harley Quinn titles
DC Animated Universe comics